Vera Dushevina was the defending champion but did not complete in the Juniors this year.

Kirsten Flipkens defeated Anna Chakvetadze in the final, 6–4, 3–6, 6–3 to win the girls' singles tennis title at the 2003 Wimbledon Championships.

Seeds

  Sunitha Rao (quarterfinals)
  Carly Gullickson (quarterfinals)
  Michaëlla Krajicek (third round)
  Jarmila Gajdošová (semifinals)
  Alisa Kleybanova (second round)
  Kateřina Böhmová (first round)
  Ally Baker (quarterfinals)
  Ryōko Fuda (first round)
  Vojislava Lukić (second round)
  Andrea Hlaváčková (second round)
  Emma Laine (semifinals)
  Tatiana Golovin (quarterfinals)
  Viktoriya Kutuzova (second round)
  Casey Dellacqua (second round)
  Marta Domachowska (first round)
  Sania Mirza (second round)

Draw

Finals

Top half

Section 1

Section 2

Bottom half

Section 3

Section 4

References

External links

Girls' Singles
Wimbledon Championship by year – Girls' singles